Hristina Milenova Pencheva, better known by her stage name Tita, is a Bulgarian singer, model, and actress who rose to fame in late 2014 after participating in X Factor Bulgaria.  Tita is currently signed to Bulgarian hip hop artist Krisko's record label imprint Adamand Records.

Career

2014–2015: X-Factor and Sweet 16

Born in Tutrakan, in 2014 Hristina auditioned in the Bulgarian version of the reality show The X Factor as part of the Sweet 16 girl band. She joined the show as a solo performer, but later X-Factor judges formed a girl's group with Hristina, Gery-Nikol and Mishel Straminski, with Bulgarian singer Zaki as their mentor. They left the competition after being eliminated in the seventh live show.

2016–present: Adamand Records
Following her departure from X Factor Bulgaria, Hristina started performing as a model, presenting for Bulgarian modeling agency Megz Angels. On 6 October 2016 she was announced as the first recording artist to be signed to Krisko's label Adamand Records. Hristina subsequently adopted the stage name Tita and her debut single "Voodoo Kukla" was released on the same day featuring Krisko, accompanied by a music video. Her second single entitled "Kasay" was revealed on 19 May 2017. On 6 December 2017 she presented her third single "Antilopa" to the public. In 2018, she made her first guest appearance on Krisko's song "Iskam Da Buda S Teb", where she performed the chorus.

In 2019 Tita was one of the stars of the Bulgarian TV show "Kato Dve Kapki Voda".

Acting
In mid-2017, Hristina appeared on the Bulgarian web-based teen drama series Sledvai Me (Follow Me), where she played the protagonist, Bela.

Discography

Albums
Аз съм ТИТА(2020)

Singles

As lead artist

As featured artist

Music videos

Filmography

References

External links
 Official Facebook profile

1999 births
Living people
People from Silistra
Bulgarian pop singers
21st-century Bulgarian women singers
X Factor (Bulgarian TV series)